Virtues is the third full-length studio album by pop-punk band Amber Pacific, released on April 13, 2010.  This was the band's only album on Victory Records and their only without vocalist Matt Young, who left the group in early 2008 to pursue a career in public education.  "Three Words" is the lead single off the album, released on March 23, 2010. It was written by the band's new vocalist, Jesse Cottam. This is also the last album with original bassist Greg Strong, who left the band in 2011.

"The Good Life" was previously released on Amber Pacific's self-titled EP, released in 2009, while "An Anthem for the Young at Heart" is currently streaming from the band's official MySpace.

Track listing

Personnel
Jesse Cottam — lead vocals
Will Nutter — lead guitar, vocals, keyboards
Greg Strong — bass
Dango — drums
Davy Rispoli — guitar, backup vocals
Katie Freeze – string arrangements
Rachael Pearson – violin
Stephen Bryant – violin
Sue Jane Bryant – viola
Walter Gray – cello

References

2010 albums
Amber Pacific albums
Victory Records albums
Albums produced by Martin Feveyear